Succession to the British throne is determined by descent, sex, legitimacy, and religion. Under common law, the Crown is inherited by a sovereign's children or by a childless sovereign's nearest collateral line. The Bill of Rights 1689 and the Act of Settlement 1701 restrict succession to the throne to the legitimate Protestant descendants of Sophia of Hanover who are in "communion with the Church of England". Spouses of Catholics were disqualified from 1689 until the law was amended in 2015. Protestant descendants of those excluded for being Roman Catholics are eligible.

King Charles III is the sovereign, and his heir apparent is his elder son, William, Prince of Wales. William's eldest child, Prince George, is second in line, followed by George's younger sister, Princess Charlotte, before her younger brother, Prince Louis. Fifth in line is Prince Harry, Duke of Sussex, the younger son of the King; sixth is Harry's elder child, Prince Archie. Under the Perth Agreement, which came into effect in 2015, only the first six in line of succession require the sovereign's consent before they marry; without such consent, they and their children would be disqualified from succession.

The first four individuals in the line of succession who are over 21, and the sovereign's consort, may be appointed counsellors of state. Counsellors of state perform some of the sovereign's duties in the United Kingdom while the sovereign is out of the country or temporarily incapacitated. Otherwise, individuals in the line of succession need not have specific legal or official roles.

The United Kingdom is one of the Commonwealth realms, which are sovereign states that share the same person as monarch and the same order of succession. In 2011, the prime ministers of the then-16 realms agreed unanimously to amend the rules of succession. Male-preference primogeniture was abandoned, meaning that males born after 28 October 2011 no longer precede females in line, and the ban on marriages to Catholics was lifted. The monarch still needs to be in communion with the Church of England. After the necessary legislation had been enacted in accordance with each realm's constitution, the changes took effect on 26 March 2015.

Current line of succession 
No official, complete version of the line of succession is maintained. The exact number, in more remote collateral lines, of the people who would be eligible is uncertain. In 2001, American genealogist William Addams Reitwiesner compiled a list of 4,973 living descendants of the Electress Sophia in order of succession without omitting Roman Catholics. When updated in January 2011, the list included 5,753.

The annotated list below covers the first part of this line of succession, being limited to descendants of the sons of King George V, King Charles III's great-grandfather. The order of the first twenty-three numbered in the list, all descendants of Queen Elizabeth II, is given on the official website of the British monarchy; other list numbers and exclusions are explained by annotations and footnotes below. People named in italics are unnumbered either because they are deceased or because sources report them to be excluded from the succession.

 King George V (1865–1936)
 King George VI (1895–1952)
 Queen Elizabeth II (1926–2022)
 King Charles III (b. 1948)
 (1) William, Prince of Wales (b. 1982) 
 (2) Prince George of Wales (b. 2013) 
 (3) Princess Charlotte of Wales (b. 2015) 
 (4) Prince Louis of Wales (b. 2018) 
 (5) Prince Harry, Duke of Sussex (b. 1984) 
  (6) Prince Archie of Sussex (b. 2019) 
  (7)  Princess Lilibet of Sussex (b. 2021) 
 (8) Prince Andrew, Duke of York (b. 1960) 
 (9) Princess Beatrice (b. 1988) 
(10) Sienna Mapelli Mozzi (b. 2021) 
 (11) Princess Eugenie (b. 1990) 
 (12) August Brooksbank (b. 2021) 
 (13) Prince Edward, Duke of Edinburgh (b. 1964) 
 (14) James Mountbatten-Windsor, Earl of Wessex (b. 2007) 
 (15) Lady Louise Mountbatten-Windsor (b. 2003) 
 (16) Anne, Princess Royal (b. 1950) 
 (17) Peter Phillips (b. 1977) 
 (18) Savannah Phillips (b. 2010) 
 (19) Isla Phillips (b. 2012) 
 (20) Zara Tindall (née Phillips; b. 1981) 
 (21) Mia Tindall (b. 2014) 
 (22) Lena Tindall (b. 2018) 
 (23) Lucas Tindall (b. 2021) 
 Princess Margaret, Countess of Snowdon (1930–2002) 
 (24) David Armstrong-Jones, 2nd Earl of Snowdon (b. 1961) 
 (25) Charles Armstrong-Jones, Viscount Linley (b. 1999) 
 (26) Lady Margarita Armstrong-Jones (b. 2002) 
 (27) Lady Sarah Chatto (née Armstrong-Jones; b. 1964) 
 (28) Samuel Chatto (b. 1996) 
 (29) Arthur Chatto (b. 1999) 
 Prince Henry, Duke of Gloucester (1900–1974) 
 (30) Prince Richard, Duke of Gloucester (b. 1944) 
 (31) Alexander Windsor, Earl of Ulster (b. 1974) 
 (32) Xan Windsor, Lord Culloden (b. 2007) 
 (33) Lady Cosima Windsor (b. 2010) 
 (34) Lady Davina Windsor (b. 1977) 
 (35) Senna Lewis (b. 2010) 
 (36) Tāne Lewis (b. 2012) 
 (37) Lady Rose Gilman (née Windsor; b. 1980) 
 (38) Lyla Gilman (b. 2010) 
 (39) Rufus Gilman (b. 2012) 
 Prince George, Duke of Kent (1902–1942)
 (40) Prince Edward, Duke of Kent (b. 1935) 
 (41) George Windsor, Earl of St Andrews (b. 1962) 
 Edward Windsor, Lord Downpatrick (b. 1988) 
 Lady Marina Windsor (b. 1992) 
 (42) Lady Amelia Windsor (b. 1995) 
 Lord Nicholas Windsor (b. 1970) 
 (43) Albert Windsor (b. 2007)  
 (44) Leopold Windsor (b. 2009)  
 (45) Louis Windsor (b. 2014) 
 (46) Lady Helen Taylor (née Windsor; b. 1964) 
 (47) Columbus Taylor (b. 1994) 
 (48) Cassius Taylor (b. 1996) 
 (49) Eloise Taylor (b. 2003) 
 (50) Estella Taylor (b. 2004) 
 (51) Prince Michael of Kent (b. 1942) 
 (52) Lord Frederick Windsor (b. 1979) 
 (53) Maud Windsor (b. 2013) 
 (54) Isabella Windsor (b. 2016) 
 (55) Lady Gabriella Kingston (née Windsor; b. 1981) 
 (56) Princess Alexandra, The Honourable Lady Ogilvy (b. 1936) 
 (57) James Ogilvy (b. 1964) 
 (58) Alexander Ogilvy (b. 1996) 
 (59) Flora Vesterberg (née Ogilvy; b. 1994) 
 (60) Marina Ogilvy (b. 1966) 
 (61) Christian Mowatt (b. 1993) 
 (62) Zenouska Mowatt (b. 1990)

History

England
In 1485, Henry Tudor, a female-line descendant of a legitimated branch of the royal house of Lancaster, the House of Beaufort, assumed the English crown as Henry VII, after defeating Richard III, who was killed at the battle of Bosworth when leading a charge against Henry's standard. Richard was the last king of the House of York, and the last of the Plantagenet dynasty. Henry declared himself king retroactively from 21 August 1485, the day before his victory over Richard at Bosworth Field, and caused Richard's Titulus Regius to be repealed and expunged from the Rolls of Parliament. After Henry's coronation in London in October that year, his first parliament, summoned to meet at Westminster in November, enacted that "the inheritance of the crown should be, rest, remain and abide in the most royal person of the then sovereign lord, King Henry VII, and the heirs of his body lawfully coming."

Henry VII was followed by his son, Henry VIII. Though his father descended from the Lancastrians, Henry VIII could also claim the throne through the Yorkist line, as his mother Elizabeth was the daughter of Edward IV. In 1542, Henry also assumed the title King of Ireland; this would pass down with the monarchs of England, and later Great Britain, until the Acts of Union 1800 merged the separate crowns into that of the United Kingdom.

Henry VIII's numerous marriages led to several complications over succession. Henry VIII was first married to Catherine of Aragon, by whom he had a daughter named Mary. His second marriage, to Anne Boleyn, resulted in a daughter named Elizabeth. Henry VIII had a son, Edward, by his third wife, Jane Seymour. An Act of Parliament passed in 1533 declared Mary illegitimate; another passed in 1536 did the same for Elizabeth. Though the two remained illegitimate, an Act of Parliament passed in 1544 allowed reinserting them, providing further "that the King should and might give, will, limit, assign, appoint or dispose the said imperial Crown and the other premises … by letters patent or last will in writing." Mary and Elizabeth, under Henry VIII's will, were to be followed by the granddaughters of the King's deceased sister Mary Tudor, Duchess of Suffolk (he, however, excluded Mary’s still living daughters, Frances Grey, Duchess of Suffolk and Eleanor Clifford, Countess of Cumberland). This will also excluded from the succession the descendants of Henry's eldest sister Margaret Tudor, who were the rulers of Scotland.

When Henry VIII died in 1547, the young Edward succeeded him, becoming Edward VI. Edward VI was the first Protestant Sovereign to succeed to the throne of England. He attempted to divert the course of succession in his will to prevent his Catholic half-sister, Mary, from inheriting the throne. He excluded Mary and Elizabeth, settling on the Duchess of Suffolk's daughter, Lady Jane Grey. Jane was also originally excluded on the premise that no woman could reign over England. Nonetheless, the will, which originally referred to Jane's heirs-male, was amended to refer to Jane and her heirs-male. Upon Edward VI's death in 1553, Jane was proclaimed Queen of England and Ireland. She was not universally recognised and after nine days she was overthrown by the popular Mary. As Henry VIII's will had been approved by an act of Parliament in 1544, Edward's contravening will was unlawful and ignored.

Mary was succeeded by her half-sister, Elizabeth, who broke with the precedents of many of her predecessors, and refused to name an heir. Whilst previous monarchs (including Henry VIII) had specifically been granted authority to settle uncertain successions in their wills, the Treasons Act 1571 asserted that Parliament had the right to settle disputes, and made it treason to deny Parliamentary authority. Wary of threats from other possible heirs, Parliament further passed the Act of Association 1584, which provided that any individual involved in attempts to murder the Sovereign would be disqualified from succeeding. (The Act was repealed in 1863.)

Scotland
The House of Stewart (later Stuart) had ruled in Scotland since 1371. It followed strict rules of primogeniture.

After the union of the crowns

Stuarts
Elizabeth I of England and Ireland was succeeded by King James VI of Scotland, her first cousin twice removed, even though his succession violated Henry VIII's will, under which Lady Anne Stanley, heiress of Mary Tudor, Duchess of Suffolk, was supposed to succeed. James asserted that hereditary right was superior to statutory provision and, as King of Scotland, was powerful enough to deter any rival. He reigned as James I of England and Ireland, thus effecting the Union of the Crowns, although England and Scotland remained separate sovereign states until 1707. His succession was rapidly ratified by Parliament.

James's eldest surviving son and successor, Charles I, was overthrown and beheaded in 1649 and the monarchy was abolished. A few years later, it was replaced by the Protectorate under Oliver Cromwell, a de facto monarch with the title of Lord Protector rather than King. Cromwell had the right to name his successor, which he exercised on his deathbed by choosing his son, Richard Cromwell. Richard was ineffective and was quickly forced from office. Shortly afterwards, the monarchy was restored, with Charles I's son Charles II as King.

James II and VII, a Roman Catholic, followed his brother Charles II, despite efforts in the late 1670s to exclude him in favour of Charles's illegitimate Protestant son, the Duke of Monmouth. James was deposed when his Protestant opponents forced him to flee from England in 1688. Parliament then deemed that James had, by fleeing the realms, abdicated the thrones and offered the Crowns not to the King's infant son James but to his Protestant daughter Mary and to her husband William, who as James's nephew was the first person in the succession not descended from him. The two became joint Sovereigns (a unique circumstance in British history) as William III of England and Ireland (and II of Scotland) and Mary II of England, Scotland and Ireland. William had insisted on this unique provision as a condition of his military leadership against James.

The English Bill of Rights and the Scottish Claim of Right Act, both passed in 1689, determined succession to the English, Scottish and Irish Thrones. First in the line were the descendants of Mary II. Next came Mary's sister Princess Anne and her descendants. Finally, the descendants of William by any future marriage were added to the line of succession. Only Protestants were allowed to succeed; those who married Roman Catholics were excluded.

After Mary II died in 1694, her husband continued to reign alone until his own death in 1702. The line of succession provided for by the Bill of Rights was almost at an end; William and Mary had no children and Princess Anne's children had died. Parliament passed the Act of Settlement 1701. The Act maintained the provision of the Bill of Rights whereby William would be succeeded by Princess Anne and her descendants, and thereafter by his own descendants from future marriages. The Act declared that they would be followed by James I & VI's granddaughter Sophia, Electress Dowager of Hanover (the daughter of James's daughter Elizabeth Stuart), and her heirs. As under the Bill of Rights, non-Protestants and those who married Roman Catholics were excluded. Because Sophia was a foreign citizen, Parliament passed the Sophia Naturalization Act 1705 to make her and her descendants English and therefore eligible for the throne.

Upon William's death, Anne became Queen of England, Scotland and Ireland. Because the Parliament of England settled on Sophia as Anne's heir-presumptive without consulting Scottish leaders, the Estates of Scotland retaliated by passing the Scottish Act of Security. The Act provided that, upon the death of Anne, the Estates would meet to select an heir to the throne of Scotland, who could not be the same person as the English Sovereign unless numerous political and economic conditions were met. Anne originally withheld the Royal Assent, but was forced to grant it when the estates refused to raise taxes and sought to withdraw troops from the queen's army. England's Parliament responded by passing the Alien Act 1705, which threatened to cripple Scotland's economy by cutting off trade with them. Thus, Scotland had little choice but to unite with England to form the Kingdom of Great Britain in 1707; the crown of the new nation (along with the crown of Ireland) was subject to the rules laid down by the English Act of Settlement.

Hanoverians and Windsors 

Anne was predeceased by Sophia, Electress Dowager of Hanover, and was therefore succeeded by the latter's son, who became George I in 1714.

Attempts were made in the risings of 1715 and 1745 to restore Stuart claimants to the Throne, supported by those who recognised the Jacobite succession. The House of Hanover nonetheless remained undeposed, and the Crown descended in accordance with the appointed rules. In 1801, following the Acts of Union 1800, the separate crowns of Great Britain and Ireland were merged and became the United Kingdom of Great Britain and Ireland. Between 1811 and 1820, when George III was deemed unfit to rule, the Prince of Wales (later George IV) acted as his regent. Some years later, the Regency Act 1830 made provision for a change in the line of succession had a child been born to William IV after his death, but this event did not come about.

On the death of William IV in 1837, his 18-year-old niece Victoria succeeded to the throne. After a 63-year reign, often known as the Victorian era, she was succeeded in 1901 by her eldest son Edward VII. On his death, his second son acceded to the throne as George V (Edward's first son Prince Albert Victor died during an influenza pandemic in 1892).

Edward VIII was proclaimed King on the death of his father, George V, in January 1936, Edward opened Parliament in November, but abdicated in December 1936, and was never crowned. Edward had desired to marry Wallis Simpson, a divorcee, but the Church of England, of which the British Sovereign is Supreme Governor, would not authorize the marriage of divorcees. Consequently, Parliament passed His Majesty's Declaration of Abdication Act 1936, by which Edward VIII ceased to be Sovereign "immediately upon" his royal assent as King being signified in Parliament on 11 December. The Act provided that he and his descendants, if any, were not to have any "right, title or interest in or to the succession to the Throne". Edward died childless in 1972.

Edward's abdication was "a demise of the Crown" (in the words of the Act), and the Duke of York, his brother who was then next in the line, immediately succeeded to the throne and to its "rights, privileges, and dignities", taking the regnal name George VI. He in turn was succeeded in 1952 by his elder daughter, Elizabeth II. By that time, the monarch of the United Kingdom no longer reigned in the greater part of Ireland (which had become a republic in 1949), but was the monarch of a number of independent sovereign states (Commonwealth realms). She was then succeeded in 2022 by her eldest son, Charles III.

Commonwealth realms

By the terms of the Statute of Westminster 1931, each of the Commonwealth realms has the same person as monarch and, to maintain that arrangement, they have agreed to continue the same line of succession; some realms do so through domestic succession laws, while others stipulate whoever is monarch of the United Kingdom will also be monarch of that realm. In February 1952, on her accession, Elizabeth II was proclaimed as sovereign separately throughout her realms. In October 2011, the heads of government of all 16 realms agreed unanimously at a meeting held in Perth, Western Australia, to proposed changes to the royal succession laws that would see the order of succession for people born after 28 October 2011 governed by absolute primogeniture—wherein succession passes to an individual's children according to birth order, regardless of sex—instead of male-preference primogeniture. They also agreed to lift a ban on those who marry Roman Catholics. The ban on Catholics themselves was retained to ensure that the monarch would be in communion with the Church of England. The changes came into effect across the Commonwealth realms on 26 March 2015, after legislation was made according to each realm's constitution.

Following the changes coming into effect, the positions of the first 27 in line remained unchanged, including Princess Anne and her children and grandchildren, until the birth of Princess Charlotte of Cambridge on 2 May 2015. The first to be affected by the changes, on the day they came into effect on 26 March of that year, were the children of Lady Davina Windsor—her son Tāne Mahuta Lewis (born 2012) and her daughter Senna Kowhai Lewis (born 2010)—who were reversed in the order of succession, becoming 29th and 28th in line respectively (now 36th and 35th ).

Current rules
The Bill of Rights and the Act of Settlement (restated by the Acts of Union) still govern succession to the throne. They were amended in the United Kingdom by the Succession to the Crown Act 2013, which was passed mainly "to make succession to the Crown not depend on gender" and "to make provision about Royal Marriages" (according to its long title), thereby implementing the Perth Agreement in the UK and in those realms that, by their laws, have as their monarch automatically whoever is monarch of the UK. Other realms passed their own legislation.

Anyone ineligible to succeed is treated as if they were dead. That person's descendants are not also disqualified, unless they are personally ineligible.

Marriages
The Act of Settlement 1701 provides that Protestant "heirs of the body" (that is, legitimate descendants) of Sophia, Electress of Hanover, are eligible to succeed to the throne, unless otherwise disqualified. The meaning of heir of the body is determined by the common law rules of male preference primogeniture (the "male-preference" criterion is no longer applicable, in respect of succession to the throne, to persons born after 28 October 2011), whereby older children and their descendants inherit before younger children, and a male child takes precedence over a female sibling. Children born out of wedlock and adopted children are not eligible to succeed. Illegitimate children whose parents subsequently marry are legitimated, but remain ineligible to inherit.

The Royal Marriages Act 1772 (repealed by the Succession to the Crown Act 2013) further required descendants of George II to obtain the consent of the reigning monarch to marry. (The requirement did not apply to descendants of princesses who married into foreign families, as well as, from 1936, any descendants of Edward VIII, of whom there are none.) The Act provided, however, that if a dynast older than twenty-five years notified the Privy Council of his or her intention to marry without the consent of the Sovereign, then he or she may have lawfully done so after one year, unless both houses of Parliament expressly disapproved of the marriage. A marriage that contravened the Royal Marriages Act was void, and the resulting offspring illegitimate and thus ineligible to succeed, though the succession of the dynast who failed to obtain consent was not itself affected. This also had the consequence that marriage to a Roman Catholic without permission was void, so that the dynast was not disqualified from succeeding on account of being married to a Roman Catholic. Thus when the future George IV attempted to marry the Roman Catholic Maria Fitzherbert in 1785 without obtaining permission from George III he did not disqualify himself from inheriting the throne in due course. A marriage voided by the 1772 act prior to its repeal remains void "for all purposes relating to the succession to the Crown" under the 2013 act.

The constitutional crisis arising from Edward VIII's decision to marry a divorcee in 1936 led to His Majesty's Declaration of Abdication Act 1936, which provided that Edward VIII and his descendants would have no claim to the throne. The Act is no longer applicable, because Edward died in 1972 without issue.

Under the Succession to the Crown Act 2013, the first six persons in line to the throne must obtain the sovereign's approval before marrying. Marriage without the Sovereign's consent disqualifies the person and the person's descendants from the marriage from succeeding to the Crown, but the marriage is still legally valid.

Religion
Rules relating to eligibility established by the Bill of Rights are retained under the Act of Settlement and the Acts of Union 1707. Under Article II of the Treaty of Union between England and Scotland (which was given legal force by the acts of the English and Scottish parliaments), the succession to the throne is limited to "the Heirs of [Electress Sophia's] body being Protestants." The Act of Settlement also states that "whosoever shall hereafter come to the Possession of this Crown shall join in Communion with the Church of England". The definition of being "in Communion with the Church of England" has been interpreted broadly; for instance, King George I was Lutheran.

The Bill of Rights specifically excludes Roman Catholics from being sovereign, to the extent that they "shall be excluded and be for ever uncapeable to inherit possesse or enjoy the Crowne", thus ignoring any potential conversion from Roman Catholicism to Protestantism. As such, a Roman Catholic is viewed as "naturally dead" for the purposes of succession. The Act of Settlement further provided that anyone who married a Roman Catholic was ineligible to succeed. The Act did not require that the spouse be Anglican; it only barred those who married Roman Catholics. The Succession to the Crown Act 2013 removed the ban on individuals who marry Roman Catholics, though not on Roman Catholics themselves, because the monarch is Supreme Governor of the Church of England.

Treason
Under the Treason Act 1702 and the Treason (Ireland) Act 1703, it is treason to "endeavour to deprive or hinder any person who shall be the next in succession to the crown ... from succeeding ... to the imperial crown of this realm". Since the Crime and Disorder Act 1998, the maximum penalty has been life imprisonment.

Accession

In the Commonwealth realms, upon the death of a sovereign, the heir apparent or heir presumptive succeeds to the throne immediately, with no need for confirmation or further ceremony. Nevertheless, the Accession Council meets and decides upon the making of the accession proclamation, which by custom has for centuries been ceremonially proclaimed in public places, in London, York, Edinburgh and other cities. The anniversary is observed throughout the sovereign's reign as Accession Day, including royal gun salutes in the United Kingdom.

Formerly, a new sovereign proclaimed his or her own accession. But on the death of Elizabeth I an Accession Council met to proclaim the accession of James I to the throne of England. James was then in Scotland and reigning as King James VI of Scotland. This precedent has been followed since. Now, the Accession Council normally meets in St James's Palace. Proclamations since James I's have usually been made in the name of the Lords Spiritual and Temporal, the Privy Council, the Lord Mayor, Aldermen and citizens of the City of London and "other principal Gentlemen of quality", though there have been variations in some proclamations. The proclamation of accession of Elizabeth II was the first to make mention of representatives of members of the Commonwealth.

Upon his or her accession, a new sovereign is required by law to make and subscribe several oaths. The Bill of Rights of 1689 first required the sovereign to make a public declaration of non-belief in Roman Catholicism. This declaration, known as the Accession Declaration, is required to be taken either at the first meeting of parliament of his or her reign (i.e. during the State Opening of Parliament) or at his or her coronation, whichever occurs first. The wording of the declaration was changed in 1910 as the previous wording was deemed to be overly anti-Catholic. Rather than denouncing Roman Catholicism, the sovereign now declares him or herself to be a Protestant and that he or she will "uphold and maintain" the Protestant succession. In addition to the Accession Declaration, the new sovereign is required by the Acts of Union 1707 to make an oath to "maintain and preserve" the Church of Scotland. This oath is normally made at the sovereign's first meeting of the Privy Council following his or her accession. According to the Regency Act 1937, should the sovereign be under the age of 18, such oaths and declarations required to be taken by the sovereign shall be made upon attainment of that age.

After a period of mourning, the new sovereign is usually consecrated and crowned in Westminster Abbey. Normally, the Archbishop of Canterbury officiates, though the sovereign may designate any other bishop of the Church of England. A coronation is not necessary for a sovereign to reign; for example, Edward VIII was never crowned, yet during his short reign was the undoubted king.

See also

Explanatory notes

References

Citations

General and cited sources

Blackstone, William (1765). "Chapter 3: Of The King, and His Title" . Commentaries on the Laws of England, Vol. 1. Oxford: Clarendon Press.
Bogdanor, Vernon (1995). The Monarchy and the Constitution. Oxford: Clarendon Press. .
Bryant, A. (1975). A Thousand Years of British Monarchy. London: Collins.

External links
Text of the Bill of Rights 1689
Text of the Act of Settlement 1701
Full text of the Succession to the Crown Act 2013.
"Royal Family tree and line of succession" at the BBC website, 29 June 2018. Biographies of the Queen's descendants in order of their place in the line of succession.
British line of succession on any date back to 1820.

 
British monarchy
British royal family
British royalty
Constitution of the United Kingdom
United Kingdom